East China School District is a school district in East China Township, Michigan, United States.

Schools 
It operates the following schools:
Belle River Elementary School
Gearing Elementary School
Marine City Middle School
Marine City High School
Palms Elementary School
Pine River Elementary School
Riverview East High School
St. Clair Middle School
St. Clair High School

St. Clair Middle School 
St. Clair Middle School is a 5-8 (grade) middle school in St. Clair, Michigan operated by East China School District. It is located at 4335 Yankee Rd. The principal is Mr. Michael Domagalski and the assistant principal is Mr. Bradley Robbins. The school has an enrollment of over 500.

St. Clair High School
St. Clair High School is a comprehensive four-year public high school in St. Clair, Michigan, operated by East China School District and built in 1960. The school has an enrollment of over 800.

References

External links

Education in St. Clair County, Michigan
School districts in Michigan